Anna Andreevna Myzdrikova (born October 22, 1992) is a Russian artistic gymnast. She won two medals at the 2010 European Championships.

Career 
In 2008, Myzdrikova competed in the Pacific Rim Championships. She won gold on the vault with a score of 14.400 and bronze on the floor with a score of 15.050.

Myzdrikova competed at the 2009 World Championships. She qualified first into the floor final and third into the vault final. She finished fourth on floor and sixth on vault.

At the 2010 European Championships, she won the gold medal with her team and the silver medal on the floor exercise.

Myzdrikova was originally a member of the 2010 Russian women's gymnastics team that competed at the World Championships in Rotterdam. However, she was placed as an alternate during qualifications and the team finals. At the 2011 Summer Universiade, she placed third with her team, and she placed second on vault.

At the 2013 Russian Nationals, Myzdrikova won the silver with her team, Moscow, but placed seventeenth in the all-around.

Notable skills 
Floor exercise: (1) Round-off, back-handspring, triple twisting layout, connected to a back tuck.  (2) Round-off, whip-back, double Arabian.

Competitive history

References

External links
 
 

1992 births
Living people
Russian female artistic gymnasts
European champions in gymnastics
Universiade medalists in gymnastics
Universiade silver medalists for Russia
Universiade bronze medalists for Russia
Medalists at the 2011 Summer Universiade
Gymnasts from Moscow